Tephritis recurrens is a species of tephritid or fruit flies in the genus Tephritis of the family Tephritidae.

Distribution
Europe to Kazakhstan & Caucasus, China.

References

Tephritinae
Insects described in 1869
Diptera of Europe
Diptera of Asia